Amer Ali Ahmed Khalaf is a Jordanian footballer who plays as a defender for Al-Jalil and Jordan U-22.

References

External links
 

Living people
Jordanian footballers
Jordan international footballers
Jordan youth international footballers
Association football midfielders
1992 births
Jordanian Pro League players
Al-Jalil players
Kufrsoum SC players
Al-Ramtha SC players
Al-Hussein SC (Irbid) players